Count Gustaf (also Gustav) Otto Douglas (23 February 1687 – 2 February 1771) was a Swedish mercenary of Scottish descent, grandson of Robert Douglas, Count of Skenninge. He was captured by the Russian army in the Battle of Poltava during the rout of the Swedish troops and was eventually employed by Peter the Great during the Great Northern War. In 1717, Douglas was appointed General Governor of Finland and ensured the stability of the local administration. However, his repressive policy in the region made him extremely unpopular and feared among the Finnish population. As the General Governor of an occupied province, Douglas deported thousands of civilians from Finland to Russia in order to put them to forced labour or military service and floated the idea of sending about 20,000 Finns to help with the construction of Saint Petersburg. His reign in a war-ravaged country was also overshadowed by epidemics of plague, which were often caused by troop movements and famines in the Europe of the eighteenth century.

References

|-

Imperial Russian Army generals
1687 births
1771 deaths
Gustaf Otto Douglas
Swedish people of Scottish descent
Swedish Governors-General of Finland